Fishscale is the fifth studio album by American rapper and Wu-Tang Clan member Ghostface Killah, released March 28, 2006, on Def Jam in the United States. The album features guest appearances from every member of the Wu-Tang Clan, as well as Ghostface Killah's Theodore Unit. It also features production from several acclaimed producers, such as MF DOOM, Pete Rock, J Dilla, and Just Blaze, among others. The album follows an organized crime theme, and is named after a term for uncut cocaine.

Fishscale sold nearly 110,000 units in its first week of release, and debuted at number four on the Billboard 200, and number two on the Top R&B/Hip-Hop Albums chart, making it the highest charting Ghostface Killah album since his 1996 debut, Ironman. The singles "Back Like That," and "Be Easy" entered the US Hot R&B/Hip-Hop Songs chart, with the former peaking at the 14th position. Upon its release, Fishscale received universal acclaim, with critics praising the album's cohesiveness, lyricism, and production. , the album had sold 332,000 copies.

Background
In January 2006, a sampler was released containing full versions of "Be Easy," "Back Like That," and "Kilo," as well as shortened versions of "Big Girl" and "Charlie Brown". It also included an alternate version of "The Champ". "Charlie Brown," which was produced by MF Doom, contained a sample from Caetano Veloso's "Alfomega" that did not ultimately receive clearance, and the song did not appear on the final album. Similarly, "The Champ" was not cleared and an altered version found its way on to the album.

J Dilla created his two productions for Ghostface, but also used them on his instrumental album Donuts; MF Doom's productions are taken from his Special Herbs series of albums.

Critical reception 

Upon its release, Fishscale received universal acclaim from music critics. At Metacritic, which assigns a normalized rating out of 100 to reviews from mainstream critics, the album received an average score of 88, based on 32 reviews. Robert Christgau of The Village Voice called it a crack-trade "trend record that ranks with any Biggie or Wu CD". He found Ghostface Killah's stories to be as "vivid, brutal, and thought-out as any noir" and felt that the music features "a powerfully souled and sampled Clan-type groove" and a "screeching intensity" similar to Public Enemy's 1988 album It Takes a Nation of Millions to Hold Us Back. Writing for Entertainment Weekly, Raymond Fiore said that "he may not be reinventing himself with Fishscale, but as a must-hear street storyteller, Ghostface Killah's still at the top of his game." Matt Barone from XXL wrote that, "with a few forced collaborations being its only flaw, Fishscale is Ghost’s most addictive dosage post Supreme Clientele. Packed with vivid street tales, comic relief and straight spittin’, the album continues his standard of excellence."

Steve Jones from USA Today wrote that "Ghostface takes a timeworn hip-hop theme — dealing cocaine, and creates a riveting listening experience. He doesn't so much deliver rhymes as narrate graphically detailed scenes, rife with violence, passion and a little humor." AllMusic writer Andy Kellman wrote in his review "...Ghost responds by pouring all that he has, both lyrically and vocally, into every track on the album. The scenarios he recounts are as detailed and off-the-wall as ever, elaborate screenplays laid out with a vocal style that's ceaselessly fluid and never abrasive." In Q, Ted Kessler wrote, "Rappers rarely improve with age, but Wu-Tang Clan veteran Ghostface is the exception… Whether Ghostface's explaining how to cook crack on 'Kilo', how he likes his hair cut on 'Barbershop', or how he came to swim with 'SpongeBob in a Bentley Coupe' on 'Underwater', he remains rap's finest storyteller." In his review for The A.V. Club, Nathan Rabin wrote:

Accolades
Fishscale was ranked as one of the best albums of the year by many famous publishers. It also appeared on several lists for best albums of the decade, with Stylus Magazine ranking it number eleven. Uncut ranked it number 62 on their 150 Best Albums of the 2000s, while Pitchfork ranked it number 75 on their Top 200 Albums of the 2000s, stating "History will remember Fishscale as Ghostface's Magical Mystery Tour: an artist convinced of his own genius empties every chamber on a batshit, pseudo-conceptual headtrip." In 2009, Rhapsody ranked the album at number nine on its "Hip-Hop’s Best Albums of the Decade" list.  The album was also included in the book 1001 Albums You Must Hear Before You Die. In 2022, the album was ranked 131st on Rolling Stones list of the 200 Greatest Hip-Hop Albums of All Time.

Track listing 
Credits adapted from the album's liner notes.

Sample credits
"The Return of Clyde Smith" (Intro) contains a sample of "Summer Dream" by Jack McDuff
"Shakey Dog" contains a sample of "Love is Blue" by Johnny Johnson & His Bandwagon.
"Kilo" contains a sample of "Ten is the number – kilos" by George Greer & Jimmy Vann.
"The Champ" contains a sample of "Synthetic Substitution" by Melvin Bliss.
"9 Milli Bros." contains a sample of "Fenugreek" by MF DOOM and "Fast Cars" by RZA.
"Beauty Jackson" contains a sample of  "Maybe" by The Three Degrees and "Hi." by J Dilla.
"Columbus Exchange" (Skit) / "Crack Spot" contains a sample of "Feed Me Your Love" by Freda Payne.
"R.A.G.U." contains a sample of "The Look of Love" by The Delfonics.
"Whip You With a Strap" contains a sample of "To the Other Man" by Luther Ingram and "One for Ghost" by J Dilla.
"Back Like That" contains a sample of "Baby Come Home" by Willie Hutch and "Song Cry" by Jay-Z. 
"Be Easy" contains a sample of "Stay Away From Me" by The Sylvers and "Mighty Healthy" by Ghostface Killah.
"Clipse of Doom" contains a sample of "Apaloosa" by Gino Vannelli and "Four Thieves Vinegar" by MF DOOM.
"Jellyfish" contains samples of "Never Can Say Goodbye" by Dennis Coffey, "Let's Get It On" by Marvin Gaye, "Special Lady" by Ray, Goodman & Brown and "Sumac Berries" by MF DOOM.
"Dogs of War" contains samples of "Family Affair" by Sly & the Family Stone.
"Barbershop" contains a sample of "You’d Better Believe It" by The Manhattans.
"Big Girl" contains samples of "You’re A Big Girl Now" by The Stylistics and "Strung Out" by William Bell.
"Underwater" contains a sample of "Orange Blossoms" by MF Doom.
"Momma" contains a sample of "Wandering Star" by David Axelrod.
"Three Bricks" contains samples of "Niggas Bleed" and "Somebody's Gotta Die" by The Notorious B.I.G.

Personnel

 Ghostface Killah – performer, producer, executive producer
 Raekwon – performer
 Trife – performer
 Sun God – performer
 Cappadonna – performer
 Shawn Wigs – performer
 RZA – performer
 GZA – performer
 Method Man – performer
 Inspectah Deck – performer
 U-God – performer
 Masta Killa – performer
 Ol' Dirty Bastard – performer
 The Notorious B.I.G. – performer
 Ne-Yo – vocals
 Megan Rochell – vocals
 Candice Wilson – vocals
 Jonathan Doyle – vocals
 Rob Mathes – bass, guitar, horn arrangements
 Tom Timko – alto sax
 Jeff Kievit – trumpet
 Birch Johnson – trombone
 Ken Lewis – multi instruments, producer
 MF Doom – producer
 Pete Rock – producer
 J Dilla – producer
 Just Blaze – producer, engineer
 MoSS – producer

 Sean Cane & LV – producer
 Cool & Dre – producer
 Sean Combs – producer
 Lewis Parker – producer
 Crack Val – producer
 Xtreme – producer
 Studio Steve – producer
 Mario "Big O" Caruso – producer, executive producer, management
 Scutch Robinson – executive producer
 Christos Tsantilis – engineer, editing
 David Brown – engineer, mixing assistant
 Morgan Garcia – engineer
 Stephen Glicken – engineer
 Mike Tocci – engineer
 Andrew Wright – engineer
 Jason Goldstein – mixing
 Gimel Keaton – mixing
 Nikos Teneketzis – mixing
 Joe Stewart – engineer, mixing
 Tony Dawsey – mastering
 Terese Joseph – A&R
Patrick "Plain Pat" Reynolds – A&R
 Ashaunna Ayars – marketing
 Tai Linzie – photography, art coordinator
 F. Scott Schafer – photography
 Alli Truch – creative director
 Dawud West – design, logo
 Lyani Powers – set design

Charts

Weekly charts

Year-end charts

References

External links

 Fishscale Reviews at Metacritic
 XXL article 
 Accolades  at acclaimedmusic.net

Ghostface Killah albums
2006 albums
Def Jam Recordings albums
Albums produced by Just Blaze
Albums produced by Cool & Dre
Albums produced by Pete Rock
Albums produced by J Dilla
Albums produced by Grind Music
Albums produced by MoSS
Albums produced by MF Doom
Mafioso rap albums